The Desert Storm Mixtape: Blok Party Vol. 1 is the debut studio album by American disc jockey and record producer DJ Envy. It was released on February 11, 2003 through Desert Storm Records. Production was handled by DJ Clue?, Erick Sermon, Ken Duro Ifill, Mono, Black Jeruz, China Black, Dame Grease, Jared Liveson, Omen, Quan Entertainment, Rockwilder, Self, Waiel "Wally" Yaghnam, White Boy, Zukhan and DJ Envy himself. It features guest appearances from Birdman, Coke, Fabolous, Joe Budden, Paul Cane, The Lox, 3LW, Busta Rhymes, DMX, Geda K, Ja Rule, Jay-Z, J Hood, Juvenile, Lil' Mo, Lloyd Banks, Murphy Lee, Petey Pablo, Kia Jeffries, Rah Digga, Redman and Vita among others. The album peaked at number 57 on the Billboard 200 and at number 8 on the Top R&B/Hip-Hop Albums.

Track listing

Charts

References

External links

2003 debut albums
Albums produced by DJ Clue?
Albums produced by Rockwilder
Albums produced by Dame Grease
Albums produced by Erick Sermon